Stefani Robinson is an American screenwriter. She is best known for her work on FX's Atlanta, for which she won two Writers Guild of America Awards, and was nominated for a Primetime Emmy Award for Outstanding Writing for a Comedy Series. Robinson is currently a writer and executive producer for the FX television series What We Do in The Shadows, for which she received Emmy nominations for writing, and for Outstanding Comedy Series in 2020 and 2022.

Life and career
Robinson moved to the Atlanta suburb of Marietta, Georgia from Hong Kong when she was 8 years old. She watched the series The Mighty Boosh on YouTube as a high school student and described it as helping her develop her own writing style. She names Willy Wonka, Austin Powers, and Baz Luhrmann’s Romeo + Juliet as other major influences. At some point, at age 15 or 16, she began taking classes and performed sketch comedy for audiences as part of an ensemble at The Second City Training Center in Hollywood

Robinson started her career as an assistant at a talent agency. After submitting a script to the American television network FX, she was hired to write for Atlanta, where she was the only woman and the youngest person in the writer's room. She has received praise for her writing and has criticized the idea that she should simply offer a “female” perspective to her work as opposed to one of an individual that’s not directly tied to gender or race.

Robinson signed a production deal with FX in 2017. She has written for several of the network's programs, including Man Seeking Woman and Fargo. Robinson is a co-executive producer and writer for What We Do in the Shadows.

Awards and nominations

References

External links 
 Stefani Robinson on IMDb

1993 births
Living people
American television writers
Writers Guild of America Award winners
American women screenwriters
American women television writers
African-American screenwriters
African-American women writers
Writers from Atlanta
American women television producers
21st-century African-American people
21st-century African-American women